Jorge Claudio Arbiza Zanuttini (born 3 March 1967) is a retired Uruguayan footballer who played as a goalkeeper.

Arbiza was part of the Uruguay squad which won 1995 Copa América, although he did not play any match in the tournament.

Arbiza started his club career in 1984 with Defensor Sporting and went on to win league titles with the club in 1987 and 1991. He moved abroad in 1995 to sign for Paraguayan club Olimpia. He won the league title in the only season he spent with them.

In 1996, he moved to Chile where he won two more league titles with Colo-Colo. He returned to Uruguay in 2000 to play for Nacional, winning another two league titles. He retired in 2004.

Honours

Club
Defensor Sporting Club
 Primera División Uruguaya (2): 1987, 1991
Olimpia
 Primera División Paraguaya (1): 1995
Colo-Colo
 Primera División de Chile (3): 1996, 1997–C, 1998
Nacional
 Primera División Uruguaya (2): 2001, 2002

International
 Uruguay
 Copa América: 1995

References

External links

 Profile at Tenfield

1967 births
Living people
Footballers from Montevideo
Uruguayan people of Basque descent
Uruguayan footballers
Uruguayan expatriate footballers
Uruguay international footballers
1995 Copa América players
Association football goalkeepers
Defensor Sporting players
Club Olimpia footballers
Colo-Colo footballers
Club Nacional de Football players
Uruguayan Primera División players
Chilean Primera División players
Expatriate footballers in Chile
Expatriate footballers in Paraguay
Copa América-winning players